The K.K. Birla Foundation was established in 1991 by Krishna Kumar Birla in Delhi. Its mission is to promote literature (especially Hindi literature) and the arts, as well as education and social work. It regularly gets mentioned in the media for the awards it confers, including:

 the Saraswati Samman  for literary work in any Indian language(22), 
 the Vyas Samman  for prose/poetry work in Hindi, 
 the Bihari Puraskar  for prose/poetry work in Hindi/Rajasthani, only authors from Rajasthan are eligible,
 the Shankar Puraskar  for a work in Hindi concerning Indian philosophy, culture and/or art,
 the Vachaspati Puraskar  for any work in Sanskrit,
 the G.D. Birla Award for Scientific Research .

Saraswati Samman a literary recognition given
annually by the KK Birla Foundation. Saraswati
Samman carries a cash award of 15 lakh rupees, a
citation and a plaque. Besides the Saraswati Samman,
two other awards have been instituted by the KK Birla
Foundation – the Vyas Samman (for Hindi works by
Indian citizens) and Bihari Puraskar (for
Hindi/Rajasthani works by Rajasthani writers) —, a
literary and cultural organisation

Noted Sindhi writer Vasdev Mohi will be honoured
with 29th Saraswati Samman. He has been selected
for his short stories collection:- Chequebook,
published in 2012. This short stories collection talks
about the agonies and sufferings of marginalized
sections of the society. He has authored 25 books of
poetry, stories and translations. He has also received
the Sahitya Akademi Award.

See also
Birla family
Manipuri Sahitya Parishad
Sahitya Akademi

References

External links
 Official website

1991 establishments in Delhi
Organizations established in 1991
Foundations based in India
Birla family
Indic literature societies
Organisations based in Delhi